Mikhalchugovo is a rural locality (a village) in Borisoglebskoye Rural Settlement, Muromsky District, Vladimir Oblast, Russia. The population was 3 as of 2010.

Geography 
Mikhalchugovo is located 42 km north of Murom (the district's administrative centre) by road. Chertkovo is the nearest rural locality.

References 

Rural localities in Muromsky District
Gorokhovetsky Uyezd